Chrysochloris is a genus of mammal in the family Chrysochloridae. 
It contains the following species:
 Subgenus Chrysochloris
Cape golden mole (Chrysochloris asiatica)
Visagie's golden mole (Chrysochloris visagiei)
 Subgenus Kilimatalpa
Stuhlmann's golden mole (Chrysochloris stuhlmanni)

References

Afrosoricida
Mammal genera
Taxa named by Bernard Germain de Lacépède
Taxonomy articles created by Polbot